The Central Philippine University Republic (CPUR), often referred to as CPU Republic, is the student government of Central Philippine University in Iloilo City. Established in 1906 a year after Jaro Industrial School (the forerunner of Central Philippine University) opened, it is the first oldest student council (student governing body) in South East Asia. CPU Republic is modeled on the Federal government of the United States and consists of three branches: executive, legislative and judicial.

Recently, the council adopted a parliamentary form of legislature still composed of senators and representatives.

Operations and structure

The CPU Republic is divided into 14 college based local government unit councils each with their own set of governors and elected provincial officials. The executive branch include the president and vice-presidents of the republic. The legislative branch is bicameral congress in structure with two branches - the senate (upper house) and the house of representatives (lower house). A parliamentary form of legislative organization has been adopted with the prime minister being selected from the upper house (senate). The judiciary branch is organized with the supreme court as the highest court in the republic composed of the chief justice and associate justices.

References

Central Philippine University